Jaycen Joshua is a mix engineer and music producer who owns the revered Canton House Studios in Studio City, California. Joshua started his mix career in 2005 when he became partners with his mentor Dave Pensado and formed The Penua Project. Joshua has won 15 Grammy Awards and mixed many Grammy Award winning records such as "Single Ladies (Put a Ring on It)" by Beyoncé and Despacito by Luis Fonsi feat. Justin Bieber. Joshua has worked with the likes of Mariah Carey, Justin Timberlake, Sean Combs, Jay-Z, Chris Brown, Miley Cyrus, Pop Smoke, Ed Sheeran, Christina Aguilera, Mary J. Blige, Rihanna, R. Kelly, Ariana Grande, The Dream, Celine Dion, J-Lo, H.E.R., Usher, BTS, Michael Jackson, Nicki Minaj, Katy Perry, Snoop Dogg, Justin Bieber, Future, Seal, Rosalía,  Nas, and Whitney Houston. He has also designed and curated the award-winning plug-in software The God Particle with Cradle Audio in 2022.

Selected singles discography

References 

 Beyoncé- I Am... Sasha Fierce
 Justin Bieber - My World 2.0 (Digital Booklet)
 Lookin' for a mix engineer! - Gearslutz.com
 Secrets Of The Mix Engineers: Jaycen Joshua
 http://www.mtechmarketing.com/ADAM_100507_Pensado.html

External links 
 http://jaycenjoshua.com/
 http://www.discogs.com/artist/Jaycen+Joshua
 http://www.wrightrax.com/2009/02/grammy-award-winning-engineer-jaycen.html

American audio engineers
Living people
Place of birth missing (living people)
Year of birth missing (living people)
People from Los Angeles
Engineers from California
Grammy Award winners